This is a list of minister from Jagadish Shettar cabinets starting from 12 July 2012 to 13 May 2013. Jagadish Shettar is the leader of Bharatiya Janata Party was sworn in the Chief Ministers of Karnataka on 12 July 2012. Here is the list of the ministers of his ministry.

Council of Ministers

|}

See also
 Politics of Karnataka

References

External links
Council of Ministers

Cabinets established in 2012
2012 establishments in Karnataka
Karnataka ministries
Bharatiya Janata Party state ministries
2013 disestablishments in India
Cabinets disestablished in 2013
2012 in Indian politics